Ressel Orla (born Theres Anna Ochs; 18 May 1889 – 23 July 1931) was an Austrian stage and film actress. She appeared in some of Fritz Lang's earliest films.

Selected filmography
 The Firm Gets Married (1914)
 The Queen's Secretary (1916)
 Halbblut (1919)
 Die Spinnen (1919/1920)
 Respectable Women (1920)
 The Clan (1920)
 The Eyes of the World (1920)
 Monte Carlo (1921)
 Hazard (1921)
 The House of Torment (1921)
 Parisian Women (1921)
 The Red Masquerade Ball (1921)
 The Devil's Chains (1921)
 The Prey of the Furies (1922)
 Lust for Life (1922)
 Inge Larsen (1923)
 The Chain Clinks (1923)
 The Third Squadron (1926)
 The Red Mouse (1926)

References

Bibliography
 Jung, Uli & Schatzberg, Walter. Beyond Caligari: The Films of Robert Wiene. Berghahn Books, 1999.

External links

 Ressel Orla at Filmportal.de

1889 births
1931 deaths
Austrian Jews
Jewish Austrian actresses
Austrian film actresses
Austrian silent film actresses
Actors from Bolzano
20th-century Austrian actresses